Dan I (1354 – 23 September 1386) was the ruler of Wallachia from 1383 to 1386. He was the son of Radu I of Wallachia and the step-brother of Mircea I of Wallachia.

The circumstances surrounding his death are unclear. Laonikos Chalkokondyles claims that he was assassinated by his stepbrother Mircea I in collusion with a boyar party. However, the Anonymous Bulgarian Chronicle states that Dan I was assassinated during a campaign fought between 1384-1386 against Ivan Shishman of Tarnovo, who was backed by the Ottomans, purportedly in favour of his half-brother Ivan Sratsimir of Vidin, but ultimately part of the early Wallachian rulers' attempts to expand their rule south of the Danube.

Dan I's descendants were members of the House of Dăneşti, one of the two factions descended from Basarab I, that were claimants to the voivodeship of the Principality of Wallachia in subsequent centuries.  The other rival faction was the House of Drăculeşti.

References

|-

1386 deaths
Rulers of Wallachia
 
Year of birth unknown
14th-century births
House of Dănești